Neil Maclean (1875 – 12 September 1953) was a Scottish socialist and an Independent Labour Party and later Labour Party Member of Parliament for Govan.

Maclean was the first Secretary of the Socialist Labour Party, but was expelled in 1908. Then a member of the Independent Labour Party (ILP), Maclean worked closely with other socialists in the Glasgow area, as part of the Red Clydeside movement. Like many other Red Clydesiders, he was a conscientious objector during the First World War. He greatly influenced Manny Shinwell. An organiser for the Scottish Co-operative Wholesale Society, at the 1918 general election, Maclean was elected to the House of Commons to represent Govan in Glasgow. When many of his fellow ILP Clydesiders left the Labour Party, Maclean remained a Labour MP, associating for a time with the Scottish Socialist Party.

Maclean retired from Parliament in 1950, not having secured renomination.  He was offered a seat in the House of Lords, but declined due to his socialist principles. He was appointed a CBE.

References

External links 
 

1875 births
1953 deaths
Scottish conscientious objectors
Independent Labour Party MPs
Independent Labour Party National Administrative Committee members
Scottish Labour MPs
Members of the Parliament of the United Kingdom for Glasgow constituencies
Socialist Labour Party (UK, 1903) members
UK MPs 1918–1922
UK MPs 1922–1923
UK MPs 1923–1924
UK MPs 1924–1929
UK MPs 1929–1931
UK MPs 1931–1935
UK MPs 1935–1945
UK MPs 1945–1950
Red Clydeside
Parliamentary Peace Aims Group